The World Organisation of Students and Youth (WOSY) is an international student and youth organisation with India as headquarters. It was founded in Delhi on 29 October 1985.

History
The World Organisation of Students and Youth was launched in Delhi on 29 October 1985 on the occasion of the International Youth Year Conference in the midst of 11,000 student delegates from fourteen countries. Atal Bihari Vajpayee, who would become Prime Minister after successfully contesting the Indian General Election of 1996, inaugurated the organisation. Air Chief Marshal Arjan Singh of the Indian Air Force and Swami Ranganathananda, thirteenth president of the Ramakrishna Math and Ramakrishna Mission, participated in the inaugural conference.

Objectives
International understanding and co-operation with the approach of "World is a Family"
Propagating the United Nations' ideals of peace and co-existence.
Bringing students and youth of the world together for the promotion of social justice and humanity.
Helping the mobility of the students and youth to enable worldwide interaction of culture, information, knowledge and wisdom.
Generating students and youth opinion and organising them for the fight against terrorism, religious fanaticism, apartheid, colonialism, racism, imperialism and oppression of any sort.
Propagating humanism and spiritualism which, combined with a scientific outlook, may offer a viable philosophy of life for the world.

Associate organisations
 Pragyik Vidyarthi Parishad, Nepal
 National Students' Forum, UK
 Tibetan Youth Congress, Dharmashala, India
 Tibetan National Congress, Dharmashala, India
 Friends Of Tibet, Dharmashala, India
 National Forum, South Africa
 Nigeria Youth and Students Organization (NYSO) Nigeria
 Akhil Bharatiya Vidyarthi Parishad, India

See also
 One World Youth Project
 Student organisation

References

External links
 

Youth organisations based in India
Organisations based in Delhi
Youth organizations established in 1985
1985 establishments in Delhi
 Vice-President-Kadiyala Thulasi